Roger von Gunten (born 1933) is an artist and sculptor, originally from Zurich, but in 1980 became a naturalized Mexican citizen.  He was the subject of a 1978 essay by Jomí García Ascot and was part of the Breakaway Generation which emerged after World War II ending the Mexican Muralist era. For over a decade, he was involved in a legal battle over who defines what is art. He has participated in over 200 national and international art exhibitions and won the 2014 Fine Art Medal from Mexico.

Biography
Roger von Gunten was born 29 March 1933 in Zurich, Switzerland. He was a student at the Kunstgewerbeschule (School of Arts and Crafts) in Zurich studying under Johannes Itten a color theorist of the Bauhaus school. He held his first solo show in Switzerland in 1956. In 1957, he came to Mexico with a plan to travel on south along the newly opened Pan-American Highway, but he ran out of money and stayed in Mexico. He initially studied etching at the Universidad Iberoamericana with Guillermo Silva Santamaria in Mexico City, but having little love for city life, soon moved to Tacámbaro in the State of Michoacán. Later, he moved to a home on the slopes of Tepozteco Mountain near the village of Tepoztlan, in Morelos.

He was a part of the movement known as Generación de la Ruptura (Breakaway Generation) who turned their back on the Mexican muralism of the previous generation of painters. It was a move away from formulaic social expression toward more personal abstract expression of forms.
Von Gunten's artwork is generally divided into three periods. The early period, which lasted through the 1970s was more painterly, impressionistic and playful, transforming the landscape with a blue-green palette of joyful expression. His middle period in the mid-1980s was dark with smudges of color. A palette of in black, blue and crimson tones merged with text in collages aimed to depict the anger of a volcano or disgust with war. Since the 1990s, his work has been a representation of imaginary forms of nature depicted in whimsical, imaginative ways. Von Gunten uses yoga to assist in his creative process and his latter works evoke Hindi thought and spirituality.

Von Gunten became a naturalized Mexican citizen in 1980. In 1982, he signed a contract with Serapión Fernández Stark, who was to promote von Gunten's work through Impulsora Art-Lat which later became Promotora de Arte Pictórico (Pictorial Art Promoters). In 1986, Art-Lat began to break its promises and unfulfill the terms signed in the contracts, so von Gunten became dissatisfied with the distribution of his work and refused to deliver any more paintings. Stark demanded fulfillment of the contractual terms and a legal battle ensued.

Initially von Gunten was ordered to pay Stark in paintings and not cash, so he painted 19 paintings to satisfy the judgment. Stark refused to accept the paintings, claiming that the style was not typical for von Gunten's work. The ensuing litigation dragged out for more than a decade. In  1994, 90 artists and intellectuals backed von Gunten's art and arranged an exhibit to display his works hanging alongside their own. At issue was whether artists have the right to free expression or whether critics, art dealers, or the courts determine the definition of art. On 10 November 1998 a district judge revoked the federal recognition that had accepted that the 19 paintings, known as Espejo (the Mirror), were satisfactory to settle the judgment. Von Gunten, who had left Mexico for a year of study in Indonesia when the paintings were accepted, called for another review on 9 April 1999. In 2001, von Guntun lost the 9th appeal and was ordered to sell his home in settlement of the debt.

A retrospective of his works was presented at the Palacio de Bellas Artes in 1989, containing over 200 of his works. In 1991 he created the scenery for the opera by Daniel Catán “La hija de Rapaccini” (the daughter of Rapaccini) which was performed at the Bellas Artes. In 1993 von Gunten became a member of the National System of Art Creators, Conaculta-Fonca. He has had numerous solo and group exhibitions both nationally and internationally and has lectured throughout the Mexican Republic.

Von Gunten has been the subject of several literary works. In 1978, he was the subject of an essay written by Jomí García Ascot. In 1999, Santiago Espinosa de los Monteros published Roger Von Gunten: La Inocente Precision del Caos and in 2004 Silvia Cherem included him in her book Trazos y revelaciones: entrevistas a diez artistas mexicanos. He received the Fine Arts Medal 2014 in a ceremony at the Palacio de Bellas Artes in Mexico City.

Selected works
Circus scenes
Tropical night
Costa with volcano
Find and singularities
Time off
Storm at Sea
Nude with mountain and mask
Buddha with flowers

References

External links
 Works, Roger von Gunten

Mexican painters
Swiss artists
Living people
1933 births
Swiss emigrants to Mexico
Naturalized citizens of Mexico